T. spinosa may refer to:
 Tara spinosa, a synonym for Caesalpinia spinosa, a tree species found in South America
 Tephrosia spinosa, a flowering plant species native from India, Sri Lanka, Malaysia and Indonesia

See also 
 Spinosa (disambiguation)